Lavaux District was a district located on the north-eastern shore of Lake Geneva (Lac Léman) in the Swiss-romand canton of Vaud between Lausanne and Vevey.  The capital of the district was Cully, but used to be Lutry.  The district is part of the World Heritage Site listed region of Lavaux.  It consisted of the following municipalities:
Chexbres
Cully
Epesses
Forel
Grandvaux
Lutry
Puidoux
includes the village of Treytorrens
Riex
Rivaz
Saint-Saphorin
Savigny
Villette

Mergers and name changes
On 1 September 2006 the municipalities of Chexbres, Cully, Epesses, Forel (Lavaux), Grandvaux, Lutry, Puidoux, Riex, Rivaz, Saint-Saphorin (Lavaux), Savigny and Villette (Lavaux) came from the District de Lavaux to join the Lavaux-Oron District.

References

External links
  Pictures of Lavaux
  Lavaux, pays aux trois soleils

Geography of Switzerland
Former districts of the canton of Vaud